Zhuge Liang is a Chinese television series based on the life of Zhuge Liang, a chancellor (or prime minister) of the state of Shu Han in the Three Kingdoms period. The plot is based on stories about Zhuge Liang in the 14th-century historical novel Romance of the Three Kingdoms. The series starred Li Fazeng as the title character and was first aired on Hubei TV in mainland China in 1985. The show has been applauded for its historically accurate sets and costumes.

List of episodes

Cast

 Li Fazeng as Zhuge Liang
 Fu Pingping / Zhao Huizhen as Huang Yueying
 Calvin Li Zonghan as Zhuge Zhan
 Huang Jiade as Liu Bei
 Wu Zhengdou / Ji Hua as Liu Shan
 Zheng Jun as Guan Yu
 Zhang Xinyuan as Zhang Fei
 Yuan Xinmin / Zhang Dawan as Zhao Yun
 Liu Mingkai as Pang Tong
 Li Jianxun as Wang Ping / Cheng Pu
 Su Houchao as Wei Yan
 Li Chengbin as Xu Shu
 Wu Chunguang as Jiang Wan
 Yue Maolin as Fei Yi
 He Yuhai as Jiang Wei
 Gong Yinzhi as Yang Yi
 Hu Kui as Yan Yan / Yan Jun
 Wang Shuhai as Shi Guangyuan
 Bao Jinxiang as Meng Gongwei
 Sun Jianzhang as Cui Zhouping
 Mei Rongqing as Huang Chengyan
 Deng Qiping as Zhuge Jun
 Shen Jianjun as Zhuge Qiao
 Zhou Dacheng as Guan Ping
 Zhu Jie as Guan Xing
 Wang Lihang as Zhang Bao / Cai Mao
 Luo Minzhi as Ma Su / Zhang Wen
 Wang Jizhi as Xiang Lang
 Tian Yiqiu as Li Fu
 Zhang Zhang as Cao Cao
 Shi Decai as Xiahou Dun
 Han Sui as Yue Jin
 Pan Zhengmin as Zhang He
 Zhang Huaizhi as Jiang Gan
 Shao Yongcheng as Zhang Yun
 Wang Zhenrong as Sima Yi
 Wu Zhenghan as Sima Shi
 Ai Wu as Sima Zhao
 Xu Zhengyun as Sun Quan
 Jiang Gengliang as Zhou Yu
 Liu Lihua as Xiaoqiao
 Feng Mingyi / Song Banggui as Lu Su
 Yang Xiuzhang as Huang Gai
 Li Jinlu as Gan Ning
 Qian Wenhua as Zhang Zhao
 Zhang Jichao as Yu Fan
 Dong Shaomin as Bu Zhi
 Zhang Qingchang as Lu Ji
 Lu Youcheng as Cheng Bing
 Zhang Qinghai as Xue Zong
 Tian Yu as Luo Tong
 Wan Wei as Zhou Xun
 Yao Kanghong as Zhang Xiu

Awards and nominations
The series won the following awards in China in 1986:

 First Prize for Outstanding Television Series, Golden Achievements Awards
 Special Award, 4th Golden Eagle Awards
 Second Prize for Outstanding Television Series, 6th Flying Apsaras Awards

See also
 The Legendary Prime Minister – Zhuge Liang
 List of media adaptations of Romance of the Three Kingdoms

External links

1985 Chinese television series debuts
1985 Chinese television series endings
Works based on Romance of the Three Kingdoms
Television series set in the Eastern Han dynasty
Television series set in the Three Kingdoms
1980s Chinese television series
Chinese historical television series
Mandarin-language television shows